Crawford Collins Martin (March 13, 1916 – December 29, 1972) was a Texas State Senator, Texas Secretary of State and Attorney General of Texas from 1967 until his death.

Early life
Martin was born to Will M. Martin and Daisy (Beavers) Martin at Hillsboro, Texas, on March 13, 1916. He was educated in the public schools, attended Hillsboro Junior College graduating in 1935. He graduated with a law degree from Cumberland University's law school (now the Cumberland Law School at Samford University) in Tennessee after attending the University of Texas at Austin, first. He was admitted to the Texas bar in 1939 and commenced the practice of law with his brother, William, in Hillsboro. Martin married Margaret Ann Mash in 1941. During World War II, Martin enlisted in the United States Coast Guard.

Political career

Mayor and state senator
After the war, Martin was elected Mayor of Hillsboro. In 1948, he was elected as a Democrat to the Texas Senate representing district 12, which his father had previously represented. The 12th district comprised all of the counties of Ellis, Hill, Hood, Johnson, Somervell in North Central Texas. During his fourteen-year career in the Senate he served on a number of committees, including Finance. He sponsored legislation in insurance reform and securities regulation, and he was elected president pro tem of the Senate in 1955. In addition, in 1957 he sponsored the state's first law requiring the registration of lobbyists.

Martin served in the Senate from 1949 to 1963, when he ran for Lieutenant Governor of Texas. In that race, he was defeated by Preston Smith in the Democratic primary. The next year, however, Governor John Connally appointed Martin as Secretary of State. Martin served as Secretary of State until 1966 when he ran for and was elected Attorney General of Texas.

Attorney General
Under Martin's leadership, the attorney general's office added antitrust, consumer protection, crime prevention, and water control divisions to its organization. Martin made drug abuse and organized crime a focus, and he was the first attorney general of any state to file successful litigation against commercial drug manufacturers for fixing the prices of antibiotics. By this action his office was able to recover more than $4,000,000 for Texas consumers. Through litigation, Martin's office established the Sabine River boundary between Texas and Louisiana, "thus preserving for Texas extremely valuable oil rights." Martin's activities as attorney general won him both state and national recognition.

Despite his record, Martin was defeated in the 1972 Texas primary by his successor as Secretary of State, John Hill. Also going down to defeat were Governor Preston Smith, Lieutenant Governor Ben Barnes and others tainted, for real or imaginary reasons, by the infamous Sharpstown scandal. All were defeated by "reform" candidates.

Martin died of a heart attack on December 29, 1972, just three days before he was to leave office. He is buried in the State Cemetery in Austin.

References

External links 

 Party Honoring Crawford Martin, Texas Archive of the Moving Image

Texas Attorneys General
Secretaries of State of Texas
Texas Democrats
1916 births
1972 deaths
Burials at Texas State Cemetery
20th-century American lawyers